Mount McHarg is located on the border of Alberta and British Columbia on the Continental Divide. It was named in 1918 after Lieutenant Colonel William Frederick Richard Hart-McHarg, British Columbia Regiment (Duke of Connaught's Own Rifles). McHarg was a British Columbia lawyer who practised in Rossland, British Columbia before serving in the Boer War where he suffered near-fatal injuries. Vancouver's Georgia Viaduct was originally named McHarg Viaduct.

See also
 List of peaks on the Alberta–British Columbia border
 Mountains of Alberta
 Mountains of British Columbia

References

McHarg
McHarg
McHarg